Barry McConnell (born 1 January 1977) is an English footballer who plays for Exmouth Town. He is primarily a right sided defender or midfielder.

Career
Born in Exeter, Devon, McConnell originally came through Exeter City's youth system in 1995, and was a first-team player for almost 10 years, featuring in a variety of positions. He also had a testimonial match against Charlton Athletic in which a host of big names played such as Danny Murphy. Exeter lost the game 4-1 and McConnell did not start but he came on to convert a penalty.

Upon his departure in December 2005, he spent a brief period with Tamworth before moving to Forest Green Rovers whom he left at the end of the 2005/2006 season.

He began the 2006–2007 season with Tiverton Town and had a short spell with Weston-super-Mare before signing an 18-month contract with Dorchester in February 2007, but Dorchester later released him.

In the 2007–2008 season McConnell again linked up with Weston after being signed by new manager Tony Ricketts. This marked his third stint at the club and he featured regularly in the first team. He made over 30 appearances for the club before signing with Truro after the close of the 2007–08 season.

References

External links

1977 births
Living people
Sportspeople from Exeter
Footballers from Devon
English footballers
Association football defenders
Exeter City F.C. players
Weston-super-Mare A.F.C. players
Tamworth F.C. players
Forest Green Rovers F.C. players
Tiverton Town F.C. players
Dorchester Town F.C. players
Weymouth F.C. players
Truro City F.C. players
Exmouth Town F.C. players
English Football League players
National League (English football) players